Looking for Water may refer to:

 "Looking for Water" (David Bowie song), a song written by David Bowie in 2003 for his album Reality
 "Looking for Water" (Alex Parks song), the first single from Alex Parks' second album Honesty

See also
Dowsing, a type of divination employed in attempts to locate ground water